Brainville may refer to:

 a song by The Flaming Lips from the 1995 album Clouds Taste Metallic
 Brainville (band), an English avant-garde supergroup

Communes in France
 Brainville, Manche
 Brainville, Meurthe-et-Moselle
 Brainville-sur-Meuse, in the Haute-Marne département

See also
 Branville, Calvados, Normandy, France